Daniel Alonim is an Israeli international lawn bowler.

Bowls career
Alonim was selected as part of the five man team by Israel for the 2020 World Outdoor Bowls Championship He also represented Israel at the 2016 World Outdoor Bowls Championship.

He won a pairs bronze medal (with Tzvika Hadar), at the 2015 Atlantic Bowls Championships.

References

Israeli male bowls players
Living people
Year of birth missing (living people)